Vinyl neodecanoate (trade name VeoVa 10) is a vinylic monomer that is virtually always used in combination with other monomers to create lattices or emulsion polymers. The trade name is an acronym of Vinyl ester of Versatic Acid with the number 10 meaning 10 carbons in the molecule. It has a medium to low glass transition temperature of -3 °C. Chemically, it is a mixture of isomeric vinyl esters of neodecanoic acid.

Uses 
Vinyl neodecanoate is mainly used as a modifying monomer in conjunction with other monomers and particularly the manufacture of vinyl acetate based polymer emulsions by the process of emulsion polymerization. Vinyl neodecanoate-containing polymers are used in decorative emulsion paints, plasters and renders especially in Europe. Vinyl neodecanoate, like most vinyl ester monomers, is very hydrophobic and the structure is highly branched with a tertiary substituted α-carbon. It is used as a hydrophobic co-monomer. This structure renders the polymers produced from it, very resistant to alkali degradation as there is no hydrogen (thus proton producing species) on the α-carbon. They have good resistance to degradation from ultraviolet light. The monomer has even been used to produce vibration dampening resins. It is claimed to produce coatings with high liquid stain repellency.

See also 
 Vinyl acetate
 Acrylate polymer
 Waterborne resins

References

External links 
 Safety Data Sheet

Monomers
Vinyl esters